Kaleh Yunjeh (also Romanized as Kaleh Yūnjeh and Kalleh Yownjeh; also known as Galeh Yownjeh, Gol-e Yownjeh, Kalah Venjah, Kaleh Vīnjeh, Kaleh Yonjeh, Kal-e Yownjeh, Kalīvanjeh, and Kalīwanjeh) is a village in Sarkal Rural District, in the Central District of Marivan County, Kurdistan Province, Iran. At the 2006 census, its population was 239, in 49 families. The village is populated by Kurds.

References 

Towns and villages in Marivan County
Kurdish settlements in Kurdistan Province